Harvey Spencer Lewis F.R.C., S:::I:::I:::, 33° 66° 95°, PhD (November 25, 1883 – August 2, 1939), a noted Rosicrucian author, occultist, and mystic, was the founder in the US and the first Imperator of the Ancient and Mystical Order Rosae Crucis (AMORC), from 1915 until 1939.

Life and career
Lewis was born in Frenchtown, New Jersey, to Aaron Rittenhouse Lewis and a German-born teacher, Catherine Hoffman. He worked in advertising as an illustrator (the modern term commercial artist best describes his line of work), and he used that experience to promote AMORC, through print ads, booklets and magazine illustrations. Lewis first learned of the Rosicrucians through his interest in paranormal phenomena. His membership of a group investigating and exposing more than 50 fraudulent mediums led to the formation of the New York Institute for Psychical Research, of which he was elected president at the age of 20.

He later related that he was initiated into a Rosicrucian order during a trip to France. Given the mission to both bring Rosicrucian ideas back to America (an immigrant German group had a settlement in Pennsylvania during the 17th century, but it had long been dissolved), and to promote them in a modern way, Lewis established AMORC, becoming its first Imperator. He translated from French and German what became the Order's first canon of lessons in mysticism, and spent the rest of his life working ceaselessly on AMORC's behalf.

Lewis engineered and supervised the creation of Rosicrucian Park, in San Jose, California, designing its unique buildings – the Egyptian-style temple, the fifth planetarium in the United States, a science laboratory, lecture auditorium, library, and administrative offices. Today his internationally recognised Rosicrucian Egyptian Museum on Naglee Avenue is a popular tourist attraction.

His second wife was Martha. They were married at least by 1917, according to his WW1 draft card, when they were living in Flushing, New York. In 1926, they sailed on the SS Majestic  to Europe and made the first AMORC Grand Tour of Egypt. reported en route in The Mystic Triangle of December 1926.

Among Lewis's prodigious talents was a penchant for audio-visual technology. With a confident voice well suited to public speaking and broadcasting, he had inaugurated talk-back radio and directed a popular children's radio club in Tampa, Florida. In San Jose, one of Lewis's programs, "The Pristine Church", was broadcast from Rosicrucian Park on Sundays, with easy-listening sermons on interfaith and secular topics. His recordings of talks, chants and other items of interest to Rosicrucian students are still in demand by AMORC lodges around the world.

Under his nomen mysticum Sar Alden, Lewis was one of the three directors of FUDOSI (Federatio Universalis Dirigens Ordines Societatesque Initiationis) representing America, Europe and the Orient. That union of the world's authentic initiatic societies aimed to counter plagiarism of their ancient symbols and rituals by remnant groups and rivals. Lewis held a number of earned and honorary ordinations, titles and degrees, many granted in recognition of his goodwill work. His son, Ralph Maxwell Lewis (1904–1987), an accomplished philosopher and author, succeeded him in 1939 as the second Imperator of AMORC. One of Ralph Lewis's many books is the biography of his father, Cosmic Mission Fulfilled.

Inventions
According to [Michael Nowicki] (F.R.C.)'s Mysterious Inventions of Dr. Lewis page (located at the Rosicrucians Salon Website), H. Spencer Lewis built several scientific devices.

They included:

Luxatone
The Luxatone or Color Organ was a device which converted audio signals into colours, displayed on a triangular screen. Lewis used it to demonstrate mystical and philosophical ideas. The audio signal was input with the aid of a microphone.

A booklet titled "The Story of Luxatone – The Master Color Organ" was printed and sent to AMORC members and to newspapers.

Cosmic Ray Coincidence Counter
This device was a prototype of a Geiger counter and was built in the 1930s.

Sympathetic Vibration Harp
The Sympathetic Vibration Harp was built by Lewis to demonstrate the AMORC's principle of sympathetic vibration.

Alchemy
In addition to his other works, on June 22, 1916, Lewis hosted what was announced as a "transmutation" of zinc into gold – a demonstration of classic alchemical principles, in New York City. A team of AMORC Grand Masters, members, one scientist and one journalist assembled, a chosen few bringing selected ingredients, which were then mixed in a brief procedure. The scientist declared the results to have the "properties of gold", and an account appeared in the American Rosae Crucis. (The ingredients for the gold recipe were not revealed; Rosicrucian Questions and Answers explained that while the necessary materials weren't hard to obtain, transmutation wasn't cost-effective; buying elemental gold was more sensible.)

Lemurians
In 1931 Lewis, under the pen name Wishar S[penle] Cerve, wrote a book (published by the Rosicrucians) about the hidden Lemurians of Mount Shasta that a bibliographic note on Mount Shasta described as "responsible for the legend's widespread popularity."

Plagiarism

Lewis authored The Mystical Life of Jesus in 1929. The book is notable for defending a variant of the swoon hypothesis that Jesus survived his crucifixion. Lewis plagiarized entire chapters from The Aquarian Gospel of Jesus the Christ by Levi H. Dowling.

Bibliography
 Rosicrucian Principles for the Home and Business (March 1929)
 Explains portions of Rosicrucian teachings and philosophy as related to work and personal goals.
 Rosicrucian Questions and Answers with Complete History of the Order
 A two-part book: Part One gives the "traditional" history of the Rosicrucian Order, with names and works; Part Two answers common new member and prospective member questions.
 The Mystical Life of Jesus
 A retelling of the life story of Jesus; reportedly plagiarized Levi H. Dowling's Aquarian Gospel.
 The Secret Doctrines of Jesus
 An explanation of many symbols, standards, and interpretations of the work of Jesus and the Twelve Apostles.
 A Thousand Years of Yesterdays
 A fictional story, explaining reincarnation as a man re-experiences past selves.
 Self Mastery and Fate with the Cycles of Life
 Relates the Cycles of Life system, similar in nature to biorhythm.
 An iPhone application for this book is available on the Apple App Store – Self Mastery and Fate iPhone App
 Rosicrucian Manual (1918, 1929 with reissues)
 Explains the structure of AMORC and includes everything a new Rosicrucian should know. 
 Mansions of the Soul: The Cosmic Conception
 Essays about Life, Death, the Afterlife, and Rebirth.
 The Symbolic Prophecy of the Great Pyramid
 Presents an interpretation of Egyptian symbology, with old and new ideas discussed.
 Mental Poisoning
 A rational examination of curses, hexes, and psychic manipulation.
 Cosmic Mission Fulfilled, 1966, Lewis, Ralph Maxwell, San Jose, Calif.
 Biography of Harvey Spencer Lewis, first Imperator of the Rosicrucian Order (AMORC).

See also

Other AMORC Imperators
 Ralph Maxwell Lewis
 Gary L. Stewart
 Christian Bernard
 Claudio Mazzucco

Notes
 XII° on his burial marker means he was a 12th degree Rosicrucian.

References

External links
 The Mysterious Inventions of Dr. Lewis
 Harvey Spencer Lewis in a San Francisco Buddhist Temple – 1929
 Black mirrors
 Information from the Religious Movements Homepage Project of the University of Virginia
 FUDOESI Document from AMORC Netherlands Website which lists the mystical credentials of Harvey Spencer Lewis (F.R.C., S.·.I.·., 33°66°95°)
 Self Mastery and Fate with the Cycles of Life iPhone Application
 Aum Om Amen Article by Harvey Spencer Lewis

1883 births
1939 deaths
19th-century American people
20th-century American non-fiction writers
20th-century occultists
American occult writers
Atlantis proponents
Lemuria (continent)
People from Frenchtown, New Jersey
Rosicrucians
Swoon hypothesis